Mahender Singh Khadakvanshi is an Indian politician and a member of the 17th Legislative Assembly of Uttar Pradesh in India. He represents the Hasanpur (Assembly constituency), which is in Amroha district, Uttar Pradesh.

References

Living people
Bharatiya Janata Party politicians from Uttar Pradesh
Uttar Pradesh MLAs 2017–2022
Year of birth missing (living people)